Michigan City station is a train station in Michigan City, Indiana, serving Amtrak.

Michigan City station may also refer to:

Michigan City Generating Station, a power plant in Michigan City
11th Street station (South Shore Line), a South Shore Line station in Michigan City
Carroll Avenue station, a South Shore Line station in Michigan City
Willard Avenue station, a former South Shore Line station in Michigan City

See also
Michigan City (disambiguation)